Piranthaen Valarnthaen is a Tamil-language film directed by Vijayasingam and written by Vietnam Veedu Sundaram, starring Goundamani. It was released on 1 October 1986.

Plot 

Goundamani is sold to Senthamarai and later deserted by his parents when he was a newborn. The nurse adopts the deserted baby, and he grows up in the nurse's family with her son S. V. Shekhar. Jeevitha, SV Sekhar's sister plays Goundamani's love interest. Goundamani is now a street smart clever and cunning young man.

Years later, unaware of the fact, Goundamani goes to work for his own father who is now a rich businessman and whose business rival turns out to be Senthamarai. Son and father band together and take on the villain Senthamarai. When he becomes aware of the past, he cleverly plays one against other taking revenge on his birth as well as adopted father for abandoning him.

Cast 
Goundamani
Jeevitha
S. Ve. Shekher
Senthamarai
Senthil

Soundtrack 
Soundtrack was composed by Shankar–Ganesh.

Reception 
Jayamanmadhan of Kalki felt Goundamani's decision to act as lead actor is both gutsy and wrong calculation and he completely looked lost in emotional and romantic scenes. He was critical of film's cinematography wondering whether the issue is with the camera or the film and dismissed Shankar-Ganesh's music as loud while concluding that S. Ve. Sekhar and Rajiv were underutilised.

References

External links 
 

1980s Tamil-language films
1986 films
Films scored by Shankar–Ganesh